Established in 1945, the Prince Aly Khan Hospital is a 162-bed multispecialty acute care hospital in Mumbai. The ISO-certified hospital is best known for its services in oncology and cardiovascular disease, and a referral centre.  The hospital is equipped with an operating complex, oncology department, cardiology department, 24-hour emergency service and a day surgery unit. It has sophisticated intensive care, renal dialysis, neonatal, paediatric and general intensive care units, a centre for gastrointestinal diseases and other facilities. Outpatient services, including free visits for the poor, are provided.

See also
Aga Khan Development Network

External links

Hospital buildings completed in 1945
Mumbai
Hospitals in Mumbai
1945 establishments in India
20th-century architecture in India